The GWR 813 Preservation Fund is an organisation that was founded in 1966 to acquire, restore and preserve Port Talbot Railway No. 26 (GWR 813). It is based on the Severn Valley Railway.

History
The Fund was formed in 1966 to purchase the last-known surviving Port Talbot Railway (No. 26, later GWR 813) steam locomotive from the National Coal Board. They purchased GWR 813 in 1967 and it was moved from Backworth Colliery the same year, later moving to the Severn Valley Railway. They are now currently based at the Severn Valley Railway and have a sales stand at Kidderminster.

GWR 813 

Their locomotive, Port Talbot Railway No. 26, is their prized possession. No. 26 was built by Hudswell Clarke in 1901 along with five other locomotives. Withdrawn in 1933, then sold to Robert Stephenson & Company in 1934. Later it was sold to Backworth Colliery and re-numbered 12. It then became NCB 11 in 1950. The newly-formed GWR 813 Preservation Fund were looking to purchase this locomotive, it being the last of its kind. Offered for £320, then sold to the Preservation Fund in 1967. It was displayed as a static exhibit at the Rail 150 Celebrations in 1975. Mechanical faults prevented the locomotive from being fully operational for over a decade, although it steamed on a few occasions.

The trust fund got their locomotive fully operational in July 2000, when it was the only one in service at the time, at the time that many locomotives were reported to have boiler issues. After it was overhauled, from 2001 to 2009 the locomotive visited several heritage lines including Didcot, Dean Forest, Pontypool & Blaenavon, WSR, South Devon Rly, Vale of Glamorgan, etc.

Owned stock
The GWR 813 Preservation Fund bought a covered van in 1968 to store parts for their locomotive, this was followed by the fund's interest in purchasing more ex-GWR stock. Today they own four coaches, and over 100 wagons of many types, in the collection is the only surviving ex-Brecon and Merthyr Railway open wagon.

Locomotives

Carriages

Brown (passenger rated) vehicles

Covered goods vans

Water & Milk Tanks

Fruit Vans

Meat Vans

Open Goods Wagons

Brake Vans

Crated Glass Wagon

Boiler Truck

Machinery Trucks

Ballast Wagons

References

External links
 GWR 813 Fund  
 GWR 813 on SVR wiki  
 GWR 813 Preservation Fund on SVR wiki 

Organisations based in Worcestershire
Severn Valley Railway